Haris Zambarloukos, B.S.C. (Greek: Χάρης Ζαμπαρλούκος; born 11 March 1970) is a Greek Cypriot cinematographer. He is known for his work in films such as Venus (2006), Sleuth (2007), Mamma Mia! (2008), Thor (2011) and Belfast (2021).

Early life and career 
Haris Zamabarloukos was born on 11 March 1970 in Nicosia, Cyprus. He obtained his BA in Fine Arts from the Central Saint Martins College of Art and Design in London. He obtained his MFA in Cinematography from the AFI Conservatory in 1997. He worked as a camera intern under Conrad Hall in A Civil Action (1998). His first feature film as a cinematographer was the 2000 film Camera Obscura. In 2006 he was named one of Variety's "10 Cinematographers to Watch". His first collaboration with director Kenneth Branagh was the 2007 film Sleuth starring Michael Caine. They collaborated again in the 2011 superhero film Thor. Zambarloukos is on the Board of Governors of the British Society of Cinematographers.

Selected filmography

References

External links 
 Official Website
 

1970 births
Cypriot cinematographers
Living people
British people of Greek Cypriot descent
People from Nicosia
AFI Conservatory alumni
Alumni of Central Saint Martins
Greek Cypriot artists